Defending champion Pete Sampras defeated Andre Agassi in the final, 7–5, 6–3, 7–5 to win the men's singles tennis title at the 1995 Indian Wells Masters.

Seeds

Draw

Finals

Top half

Section 1

Section 2

Bottom half

Section 3

Section 4

See also 
 Agassi–Sampras rivalry

External links
 Main draw

Singles
1995 Newsweek Champions Cup and the State Farm Evert Cup